Martha Jefferson Historic District, also known as Locust Grove Addition, is a national historic district located at Charlottesville, Virginia. The district encompasses 154 contributing buildings, 1 contributing site (Maplewood Cemetery), and 1 contributing structure in a primarily residential section of the city of Charlottesville. It was developed between 1893 and 1957 and includes examples of the Late Victorian and Colonial Revival styles.  Notable buildings include the Eddins-Tilden House (1901), Dorothy S. Marshall House (1941), and Martha Jefferson Hospital (1928-1929).  Located in the district is the separately listed Locust Grove.

It was listed on the National Register of Historic Places in 2008.

References

Historic districts on the National Register of Historic Places in Virginia
Victorian architecture in Virginia
Colonial Revival architecture in Virginia
Buildings and structures in Charlottesville, Virginia
National Register of Historic Places in Charlottesville, Virginia